Cleisthenes pinetorum is a flatfish of the family Pleuronectidae. Its native habitat is the temperate waters of the northwest Pacific, around Japan, Korea and Taiwan.

Nomenclature
Both species in the genus Cleisthenes - Cleisthenes pinetorum and Cleisthenes herzensteini - are commonly known as Sôhachi in Japan.

References

Pleuronectidae
Fish of the Pacific Ocean
Fish described in 1904
Taxa named by David Starr Jordan